Rhopobota nova is a moth of the family Tortricidae. It is found in Vietnam.

The wingspan is 18 mm. The ground colour of the forewings is white, strongly mixed with yellowish brown and brownish ochreous in some areas. The hindwings are brownish grey.

Etymology
The name indicates the new character of the pattern and new species of the genus.

References

Moths described in 2009
Eucosmini
Moths of Asia
Taxa named by Józef Razowski